Colin Stewart (born 6 January 1980 in Bellshill, Scotland) is a former Scotland Under 21 international rugby union player who played with Glasgow Warriors and Border Reivers. His regular playing position was Lock.

Starting off playing mini-rugby, Stewart began his rugby career playing for East Kilbride RFC. His potential was spotted by the Glasgow District Rugby Union and he was selected as one of the Glasgow Thistle squad - then essentially an academy squad for Glasgow Warriors - that would receive rugby training in the summer of 1998 in New Zealand. The training was under the ex-Glasgow Warriors boss Kevin Greene.

In the season 2000-01 he formally joined Glasgow.

For the 2002-03 season Stewart joined Border Reivers. While he was not in action for the Reivers, Stewart played for Selkirk RFC.

In 2006 he moved to England to play for Plymouth Albion.

He moved to play in France in 2009, where he played for Tarbees Pyrennes. He played 57 times for the French club in two seasons.

After playing in France he returned to south-west England in 2011, where he now plays and coaches Newton Abbot.

He is also Head of the Rugby Academy at South Devon College. He has set up a Rugby 4 Kids programme to promote rugby to the under 7s.

Stewart played for Scotland U19 and Scotland U21.

References

External links 
Pro12 Profile
Statbunker Profile

1980 births
Rugby union locks
Living people
Glasgow Warriors players
Tarbes Pyrénées Rugby players
Plymouth Albion R.F.C. players
Newton Abbot RFC players
East Kilbride RFC players
Border Reivers players
Selkirk RFC players